The Return…… (full title The Return of the Darkness and Evil) is the second studio album by Swedish extreme metal band Bathory. It was released on vinyl on 27 May 1985, through Combat Records in the US. The Return…… had a significant influence on developing the black metal and death metal genres.

Background 
Quorthon explained the album title as such: "We wanted people to just read out The Return…… – as in a second album or a follow-up – and then flip the album over to look for a tracking list. Not finding one, what they got was this apocalyptic poem with the song titles woven into it. Only after listening through the album to the end would you get the full title of the album, The Return of the Darkness and Evil".

Reception 
In various interviews, Fenriz of Darkthrone praised the album and defined it as "the essence of black metal".

Track listing 

The 2003 remastered edition combines tracks 1 and 2, and tracks 7 and 8, as well as adds the final Outro track.

Personnel 
 Bathory
 Quorthon (Thomas Börje Forsberg) – guitars, vocals, additional bass guitar, production, recording, mixing, album cover design, album back and front cover photography, 
 Andreas Johansson – bass guitar, album back and front cover photography
 Stefan Larsson – drums, album back and front cover photography

 Production
 The Boss (Börje Forsberg) – engineering, production
 Gunnar Silins – album back and front cover photography

References

External links 
 

Bathory (band) albums
Black metal albums by Swedish artists
1985 albums
Combat Records albums